The Indonesia men's national water polo team represents Thailand in international men's water polo. The team won the gold medal at the Southeast Asian Games in 2019. The team made their debut at the Asian Games in 1954. The team won the silver medal at the Asian Games in 1962, Jakarta, Indonesia.

Competition history
A red box around the year indicates tournaments played within Indonesia and best results"

Asian Games

Southeast Asian Games

Coaches

Squads

References

Water polo
Indonesia
Indonesia
Indonesia